Joint Task Force National Capital Region (JTF NCR) is an element of United States Northern Command tasked to support presidential inaugurations. .

Commander United States Northern Command tasked Joint Task Force National Capital Region to plan, coordinate and execute Department of Defense-approved support, as well as conduct liaison and coordination with the Presidential Inaugural Committee and the United States Congress Joint Committee on Inaugural Ceremonies. Immediately following the general election, the President-elect appoints the inaugural committee to plan, coordinate and host numerous celebrations and special events associated with the Presidential Inauguration. The joint committee, appointed by the House and the Senate, is responsible for conducting the swearing-in ceremony for the President-elect and Vice President–elect at the Capitol. Both of these committees historically request various forms of ceremonial support from Department of Defense.

The Joint Task Force participates in all inter-agency planning and conducts planning with joint partners in the National Capital Region. The joint force is expected to provide world-class ceremonial support for the Presidential Inauguration and the related official ceremonies and events throughout the inaugural period, continuing the tradition of military participation in the inauguration of the commander-in-chief, tracing back to the inauguration of George Washington in 1789.

In addition to the official events on January 21 during the Second inauguration of Barack Obama, other inaugural ceremonies and events were held throughout the Inaugural Period between January 15 and 24, 2013. The Department of Defense supported these events in accordance with approved Defense Department ceremonial support guidelines.

Predecessors 

Prior to the 57th Presidential Inauguration, the Armed Forces Inaugural Committee (AFIC) coordinated the United States Armed Forces participation in the ten-day period of U.S. Presidential Inauguration Day ceremonies.  That traditionally includes musical military units, marching bands, color guards, ushers, firing details, and salute batteries. AFIC also provides a "very limited amount of approved logistical support."

The military has participated in inaugural day ceremonies since President Washington.  Since the first inauguration of Dwight D. Eisenhower in 1953, that participation has been formalized into a committee, originally called the Armed Forces Inaugural Committee.

AFIC was a temporary joint military command established every four years at the direction of the Secretary of Defense.  For what became the second inauguration of George W. Bush, the committee was established in February 2004. Between then and Inauguration Day itself, the organization grew to about 400 people by December and over 700 people in January 2005.

The ten-day celebration surrounding the second inauguration of Richard Nixon in 1973 was impacted by the death of former President Lyndon B. Johnson, just two days into Nixon's new term. The remainder of the ceremonies were cancelled, as the military would have to deal with the state funeral for the nation's 36th president. Because of the inauguration, all the military men who participated in the inauguration participated in the state funeral.

See also

Joint Force Headquarters National Capital Region
United States Army Military District of Washington
Joint Task Force National Capital Region Medical

References

External links
 
 protecting Bush on Inauguration Day, a December 26 2004 article about the JTF-AFIC from the St. Louis Post-Dispatch

Joint task forces of the United States Armed Forces
Ceremonies in the United States
United States presidential succession